Stanišić is a surname found among Serbs, Montenegrins and Croats.

Notable people with the name include:

 Dany Stanišić, Serbian sailor
 Josip Stanišić, Croatian football player
 Jovica Stanišić, Serbian intelligence officer
 Lazar Stanišić, Serbian football player
 Mićo Stanišić, Bosnian Serb politician
 Nina Stanišić, Montenegrin model
 Petar Stanišić, Montenegrin football player
 Saša Stanišić, Bosnian German writer
 Strahinja Stanišić, Serbian alpine skier
 Vojislav Stanišić, Serbian American football player

See also
 
 Staniša

Serbian surnames